Eric Moe may refer to:

 Eric Moe (ice hockey) (born 1988), Swedish ice hockey player
 Eric Moe (composer) (born 1954), American composer and pianist